Melvin Farr Jr. (born August 12, 1966) is an American former professional football player who was a running back for one season for the Los Angeles Rams of the National Football League (NFL).  He attended and played college football for the UCLA Bruins.

Farr is part of a family full of professional football players.  Farr is the son of former NFL player Mel Farr, the nephew of former American Football League and NFL player Miller Farr, and the older brother of former NFL player Mike Farr.

Farr is a member of Alpha Phi Alpha fraternity.

References

1966 births
Living people
American football running backs
Los Angeles Rams players
UCLA Bruins football players
Players of American football from Santa Monica, California